Chile Route 23 (Ruta 23 CH) is a main road in the northern portion of Chile.

The Route 23 reaches an altitude of  24 km west of the border.

Places along the road
San Pedro de Atacama
Salar de Atacama
Toconao
Socaire

References

Roads in Chile
Transport in Antofagasta Region